Bear River is a small village situated at the head of the tidewaters of the Bear River. The river itself is the border between the Annapolis and Digby counties of Nova Scotia and thus, splits the village so that half the village is in Annapolis County and the other half in Digby County. 

The village is adjacent to the Bear River First Nation which administers the Bear River 6, 6A and 6B reserves.

History

Originally inhabited by the Mi'kmaq, the area was called "Eelsetkook", meaning "flowing along by high rocks." It was previously called "St. Anthony". It was also named "Imbert", after Simon Imbert, a Frenchman who commanded a relief ship for Port Royal in 1612. The name "Imbert" was gradually corrupted to "Bear". It is also occasionally referred to on maps as "Hillsburgh". This term is believed to be another corruption of "Imbert" or "Hebert", after Louis Hebert, an apothecary who accompanied Samuel de Champlain in 1604.

Bear River was an important shipbuilding location in the late 19th century. One of many large vessels built in the village was the brigantine Dei Gratia, the vessel which discovered the famous mystery ship Mary Celeste in 1872. The climate and soil conditions in the Bear River area are conducive to the growing of grapes and several vineyards have emerged. Bear River was home to the first solar aquatics waste water management facility in North America; the facility ceased to function when the Municipality of the District of Digby re-routed waste water to the Smith's Cove treatment facility.  After a few years of disuse, the community has made it into a community greenhouse. The community is known for its thriving artistic community, the largest per capita in Nova Scotia. There are many artist studios, shops and galleries in the downtown and immediate area. Crafts produced include clothing, woodwork, pottery, quilts, fabric arts, and an assortment of painted media.

The village is run by volunteers as there is no town government. The Bear River Board of Trade is the primary organization to pursue economic development and also maintains the waterfront park and Visitor Information Center. The Bear River Historical Society operates the Bear River Heritage Museum which is open through the summer and early fall with displays of historical photos, archival materials and artifacts of the rich history of the area. The Digby County Exhibition is held in Bear River each year.

The village is working to become an eco-village in its determination to remain low-tech, with no fast food, malls or box stores, and the exploration of alternative energy sources.

Notable residents
William M. Jones
Bob Snider

References

Further reading
 Darlene A. Ricker, L'sitkuk: The Story of the Bear River Mi'kmaw Community, Roseway Publishing, 1997.
 E. Foster Hall, editor, Heritage Remembered – The Story of Bear River, Bear River New Horizons Centre, ca. 1981
 John MacLeod, A Far Away Place,  2014
 Mike Parker, Frontier Town,  2015

External links 
 Bear River Board of Trade

Communities in Annapolis County, Nova Scotia
Communities in Digby County, Nova Scotia
General Service Areas in Nova Scotia